APEC is the Asia-Pacific Economic Cooperation

Specific annual economic meetings
 APEC Australia 1989
 APEC Philippines 1996
 APEC Canada 1997
 APEC China 2001
 APEC Mexico 2002
 APEC Thailand 2003
 APEC Chile 2004
 APEC South Korea 2005
 APEC Vietnam 2006
 APEC Australia 2007
 APEC Peru 2008
 APEC Singapore 2009
 APEC Japan 2010
 APEC United States 2011
 APEC Russia 2012
 APEC Indonesia 2013
 APEC China 2014
 APEC Philippines 2015
 APEC Peru 2016
 APEC Vietnam 2017
 APEC Papua New Guinea 2018
 APEC Chile 2019

Education
 APEC Schools, a chain of schools in the Philippines
 Universidad APEC

Organizations
 Alliance for the Preservation of English in Canada
 Association of Philippine Electric Cooperatives
 Atlantic Provinces Economic Council

Other uses
 Action Programme on the Elimination of Child Labour (National Action Plan on the Elimination of Child Labour)
 AP European History
 APEXC (APE(X)C), one of a line of computers

See also
AIPAC
APAC